Spectrum of Death is the debut album by American band Morbid Saint.

Overview
Spectrum of Death is actually a reissue of the band's 1988 demo Lock Up Your Children, which was licensed by Edge Entertainment to Mexican label Avanzada Metálica, who re-released it as a full-length studio album under the title Spectrum of Death in 1989; however, the album was not released in other territories until years later. It was recorded at Opus Recording (later known as Wave Digital once they removed the 2 inch tape machines in favor of Akai Digital Audio Machines) in Gurnee, Illinois. It was produced by Eric Greif and engineered by Al Pangeliron.

Spectrum of Death is often hailed as one of the best thrash metal albums ever made, as well as one of the fastest and most abrasive in the genre; which led Morbid Saint being compared to other thrash metal bands like Kreator, Slayer, Sadus, and Demolition Hammer.

Track listing
All songs on Spectrum of Death are published by Griffy Guy Publishing (BMI).

Personnel
Morbid Saint
Pat Lind - Vocals
 Jim Fergades - Guitar
 Jay Visser - Guitar
 Tony Paletti - Bass  
 Lee Reynolds - Drums

Production
 Eric "Griffy" Greif - producer, mixing
 Alan Pangelinan - engineer  
 Peter Lupini - Production Assistant
 John Kujawa - Cover artwork

Notes
 The 2005 limited edition CD re-issue by Keltic Records contains the Destruction System demo as bonus tracks. It was released without the band's consent and is considered a bootleg
 The 2008 CD re-issue by Power Play Records features an alternate cover art
 Spectrum of Death was bootlegged in Russia in 2013 and was sold at online retail websites like eBay
 The 2016 2-CD extended edition re-issue by Century Media Records contains the Destruction System demo and The Black Tape demo on Disc 1. Disc 2 contains the 2015 remastered version of Destruction System and 4 songs that were recorded from 2010 to 2011
 The 2016 12" vinyl release was re-issued as limited edition, coming in 4 colors. It is a "special" vinyl mastering, 180g vinyl including an 8-page LP-sized booklet with rare photos, flyers, interview and gatefold, limited to 1000 copies
 The 2016 2-CD re-issue by Pacheco Records contains all content from the Century Media Records CD release, plus never before seen photos and an interview with the band
 The 2019 12" limited edition vinyl by High Roller Records comes in 4 colors, issued in a 425gsm heavy cardboard cover, poster and lyric sheet printed on uncoated paper. Limited to 1000 copies
 Only 50 copies (others speak of 80 copies) of a limited edition A5 digipak CD by Gates of Hell Productions were made available and 20 promos of the 500 that were pressed because Avanzada Metálica was planning to re-release this album in A5 format, as part of a series of re-releases from the label's back catalog, but an agreement with the band was unfulfilled. The remaining copies were destroyed

References

Morbid Saint albums
1989 debut albums